The Basis of Union (often termed the BoU) is the document which formed the basis on which most congregations of the Congregational Union of Australia, Methodist Church of Australasia and Presbyterian Church of Australia united to form the Uniting Church in Australia (UCA) in 1977. It was issued in nearly its final form in 1974.

It continues to be regularly invoked in both the liturgy and the governance of the UCA, and has been updated on several occasions, most recently in 1992. In services of ordination, ordinands promise to adhere to the Basis of Union. As the document which was approved by a vote of the members of the three uniting churches prior to union, the Basis of Union is the UCA's statement of foundational spiritual beliefs, as distinct from the Constitution, Regulations, by-laws, rules and standing orders which pertain to the government and administration of the UCA. Six state laws (all titled "The Uniting Church in Australia Act 1977") required the inaugural Constitution to be "consistent with the Basis of Union."

The union is notable in that the Congregational and Presbyterian churches came from a strong theological tradition of Calvinism, while the Methodist tradition was Arminian. The union of these churches therefore required a decision on the part of both sides that the issues underlying this difference were not vital to the life of the church. Expressing this in a form acceptable to the members of all three uniting denominations was one of the many challenges faced by the writers of the Basis of Union.

Provision for continuing churches

The Basis of Union provided for a continuing Presbyterian church, consisting of all members of the existing Presbyterian church who chose not to join the new UCA and all Presbyterian congregations which did not attain a required majority, and provided for the formation of new congregations to support these members in need. As a result, many formerly Methodist buildings were given to the Presbyterian Church of Australia . Schools and other facilities were also provided to the continuing Presbyterian church.

The governance of the Congregational church made this provision unnecessary and probably impossible, as an independent vote was needed for each congregation. Forty congregations elected not to join, and subsequently formed the Fellowship of Congregational Churches.

No provision was made for a continuing Methodist church, with many former members who elected not to join the UCA subsequently joining the Wesleyan Methodist Church of Australia.

See also
Basis of Union (Presbyterian Church of Australia)

References

External links
Basis of Union (the 1971 text approved by the uniting Churches)
Basis of Union (1992 version with gender-inclusive language)

Congregationalism in Oceania
Methodism in Australia
Presbyterian Church of Australia
Presbyterianism in Australia
Uniting Church in Australia
20th-century Christian texts
1974 documents